Byse may refer to:

People
 Fanny Byse (born 1849), British sculptor
 George M. Byse (1858–1936), American farmer and politician

Places
 Byse, Shimoga, India